Giovanni Battista Spínola (1625–1705) was a Roman Catholic prelate who served as Archbishop of Genoa (1694–1705) 
and Bishop of Luni e Sarzana (1665–1694).

Biography
Giovanni Battista Spínola was born in Genoa, Italy in 1625.
On 22 April 1665, he was appointed during the papacy of Pope Alexander VII as Bishop of Luni e Sarzana.
On 13 September 1694, he was appointed during the papacy of Pope Innocent XII as Archbishop of Genoa.
He served as Archbishop of Genoa until his death on 7 January 1705.

References

External links and additional sources
 (for Chronology of Bishops) 
 (for Chronology of Bishops) 
 (for Chronology of Bishops) 
 (for Chronology of Bishops) 

17th-century Italian Roman Catholic archbishops
18th-century Italian Roman Catholic archbishops
Bishops appointed by Pope Alexander VII
Bishops appointed by Pope Innocent XII
1625 births
1705 deaths
17th-century Roman Catholic bishops in Genoa